The Women's Hammer Throw event at the 2009 World Championships in Athletics was held at the Olympic Stadium on August 20 and August 22.

Medalists

Abbreviations
All results shown are in metres

Records

Prior to the competition, the existing records were as follows.

The following records were set during this competition.

Qualification standards

Schedule

Results

Qualification
Qualification: Qualifying Performance 72.00 (Q) or at least 12 best performers (q) advance to the final.

Key:  NM = no mark (i.e. no valid result), Q = qualification by place in heat, q = qualification by overall place

Final

Key:  NR = National record, PB = Personal best, WR = World record

See also
2009 Hammer Throw Year Ranking

References
General
 hammerthrow.wz
Specific

Hammer throw
Hammer throw at the World Athletics Championships
2009 in women's athletics